A zookeeper is a worker in a zoo, responsible for the feeding and daily care of the animals.

Zookeeper may also refer to:
 Zookeeper (film), a 2011 comedy film
 The Zookeeper (2001 film), a drama film 
 Zoo Keeper (1982 video game), an arcade game from Taito America
 Zoo Keeper (2003 video game), a puzzle video game originally released as a browser game
 Zookeeper (comics), a fictional character from the Teen Titans comics
 Apache ZooKeeper, a service for coordinating processes of distributed applications
 Zookeper (born 1989), stage name of electronic music artist and producer Michael Doerr (also stylized "Zookëper")